Kurdistan Democratic Party – Progressive Front was a Kurdish political party in Iraq. It was led by Hamza Abdallah, the General Secretary of Kurdish Democratic Party who had been expelled from KDP in January 1953.

Hamza and his followers were allowed to return to KDP in 1956.

References

Political parties in Kurdistan Region
Kurdish nationalist political parties
Kurdish political parties in Iraq